Zischkaia is a genus of satyrid butterflies found in the Neotropical realm.

Species
Listed alphabetically:
Zischkaia amalda (Weymer, 1911)
Zischkaia mima (Butler, 1867)
Zischkaia pacarus (Godart, [1824])
Zischkaia saundersii (Butler, 1867)

References

, 1964: Beiträge zur Kenntnis der Insektenfauna Boliviens. XIX. Lepidoptera III. Satyridae. Veröffentlichungen der Zoologischen Staatssammlung München, 8: 51-188. Full article: pdf.

Euptychiina
Butterfly genera
Taxa named by Walter Forster (entomologist)